Mattiroliomyces is a genus of fungi within the Pezizaceae family.

References

Pezizaceae
Pezizales genera